Ramsholt is a small village and civil parish within the East Suffolk district, located in the county of Suffolk, England. It is situated on the northern shore of the River Deben.

The parish church of All Saints is one of 38 surviving round-tower churches in Suffolk and is a Grade II* listed building.

The village economy revolves around the pub next to the river dock.

Ramsholt was a historic fishing town before Felixstowe docks.

References

Villages in Suffolk
Civil parishes in Suffolk